Arthur Dixon (March 27, 1837 – October 26, 1917) of Chicago, born in Fermanagh, Ireland, was an alderman in the Chicago city council from 1867 to 1875 and from 1879 to 1891.

He died in Chicago on October 26, 1917.

References

1837 births
1917 deaths
Chicago City Council members
People from County Fermanagh
Irish emigrants to the United States (before 1923)
19th-century American politicians